Makrem Ayed (born 15 September 1973) is a Tunisian judoka.

Achievements

References

1973 births
Living people
Tunisian male judoka
Judoka at the 1996 Summer Olympics
Judoka at the 2000 Summer Olympics
Olympic judoka of Tunisia
Mediterranean Games silver medalists for Tunisia
Mediterranean Games medalists in judo
Competitors at the 1997 Mediterranean Games
African Games medalists in judo
African Games gold medalists for Tunisia
Competitors at the 1999 All-Africa Games
20th-century Tunisian people
21st-century Tunisian people